Windjammer Cable is a small cable company formed by the sale of 25 systems that served 80,000 customers in rural areas that Time Warner Cable acquired from the bankrupt Adelphia. Windjammer was created specifically for this deal and consisted of Boston private-equity concern MAST Capital Management and Jupiter, Fla.-based small cable operator Communications Construction Services (CCS).

Although it acquired some systems, such as all but two West Virginia systems, Subscribers received a letter on Jan. 24, 2009 saying that they will terminate service on February 17, 2009; date of the Digital Transition.
 
It was reported in 2010 that CCS left the partnership and the number of cable systems was reduced to 15 core markets.

In August 2011, Windjammer divested cable systems in Fort Benning, GA; Fort Payne, AL; and Cullman, AL to Charter.

See also
Adelphia Communications Corporation
Time Warner Cable
Comcast
Charter Communications

References

External links
 Windjammer Communications Website
 Areas Served by Windjammer Communications

Cable television companies of the United States